Blanche Bingley Hillyard (née Bingley; 3 November 1863 – 6 August 1946) was an English tennis player. She won six singles Wimbledon championships (1886, 1889, 1894, 1897, 1898, 1900) and was runner up seven times, having also competed in the first ever Wimbledon championships for women in 1884.

She also won the Irish championships three times (1888, 1894, 1897); the German championship twice (1897, 1900); and the South of England Championships at Eastbourne, 11 times between 1885 and 1905.

Early life
Bingley was born in Greenford, west London, the daughter of a wealthy tailoring business proprietor. She was a member of the Ealing Lawn Tennis & Archery Club.

Biography

Wimbledon
Her professional career at Wimbledon spanned almost 30 years, longer than any other woman to date. In 1884, she competed in the first ever Wimbledon championships for women, and two years later she captured the first of her six singles titles. Also a seven-time losing finalist, Bingley's 13 finals remain a Wimbledon record as is the 14-year time span between her first and last titles.

Bingley's Wimbledon record suggests that she was the second strongest female player of her day, only behind Lottie Dod, who defeated her in five finals.

After marriage to Commander George Whiteside Hillyard she usually was listed in various records as Blanche Bingley Hillyard. At age 36, she again won the Wimbledon final and continued to compete until age 49, playing her last Wimbledon in 1913.

Other championships

Bingley's first success came at the Middlesex Championships, held in Chiswick Park (west London) in 1884. She won the Irish championships on three occasions (1888, 1894, 1897) and the German International Championships, played in Hamburg, twice; in 1897, defeating Charlotte Cooper Sterry in the final in three sets, and in 1900 against Muriel Robb, also in three sets. Additionally, she won the South of England Championships at Eastbourne, then a major event, eleven times between 1885 and 1905. She also won the Sussex Championships at Brighton five times (1893–1896, 1900). She won the London Championships at Stamford Bridge three times (1886–1888), the Derbyshire Championships at Buxton six times (1888, 1893–1894, 1896, 1901, 1906), the Exmouth LTC Tournament two times (1887–1888) at Exmouth, the British Covered Court Championships (1901), the Bournemouth Open Tournament at Bournemouth (1901),

Private life
She married Commander George Whiteside Hillyard in Greenford on 13 July 1887) one week after the Wimbledon final. He was one of the foremost men's players on the international tennis circuit between 1886 and 1914. He also played first class cricket for Middlesex and Leicestershire. From 1907 to 1925, he was secretary of the All England Lawn Tennis Club and director of The Championships at Wimbledon between 1907 and 1925. He died in Bramfold, Pulborough, on 24 March 1943.

Death and legacy
Blanche Bingley Hillyard died at her home in Pulborough, West Sussex in 1946. 

She was inducted into the International Tennis Hall of Fame in 2013.

Grand Slam finals

Singles: 13 (6 titles, 7 runner-ups)

1This was the all-comers final as Lottie Dod did not defend her 1888 Wimbledon title, which resulted in the winner of the all-comers final winning the challenge round and, thus, Wimbledon in 1889 by walkover.
2This was the all-comers final as Lottie Dod did not defend her 1893 Wimbledon title, which resulted in the winner of the all-comers final winning the challenge round and, thus, Wimbledon in 1894 by walkover.
3This was the all-comers final as Helena Rice did not defend her 1890 Wimbledon title, which resulted in the winner of the all-comers final winning the challenge round and, thus, Wimbledon in 1891 by walkover.

Grand Slam performance timeline

See also
 Performance timelines for all female tennis players who reached at least one Grand Slam final

References

External links
  
Obituary in the New York Times: https://timesmachine.nytimes.com/timesmachine/1946/08/08/93144141.html?pdf_redirect=true&site=true&pageNumber=18 

1863 births
1946 deaths
19th-century English people
19th-century female tennis players
English female tennis players
People from Ealing
Wimbledon champions (pre-Open Era)
Grand Slam (tennis) champions in women's singles
International Tennis Hall of Fame inductees
Tennis people from Greater London
British female tennis players
Tennis players at the 1908 Summer Olympics